Muleskinner Live: Original Television Soundtrack is a live album by the progressive bluegrass supergroup Muleskinner.
It was recorded in 1973 and originally broadcast in the late 1970s, but the album was not released until 25 years later, in 1998. Maria Muldaur provides harmony vocals on "Sitting Alone In The Moonlight".

Track listing 
 New Camptown Races 2:53
 Dark Hollow 2:34
 Land of the Navajo 5:49
 Blackberry Blossom 2:32
 Knockin' on Your Door 3:08
 Opus57 in G Minor 2:03
 Red Rocking Chair 3:25
 Going to the Races 1:56
 Eighth of January 2:44
 I Am a Pilgrim 4:51
 The Dead March 2:41
 Sitting Alone in the Moonlight 2:42
 Orange Blossom Special 4:44

Personnel 
 Peter Rowan – vocals, guitar
 Bill Keith – banjo
 Clarence White - acoustic guitar, vocals
 Richard Greene – violin
 David Grisman – mandolin, vocals
 Stuart Schulman – bass
 Maria Muldaur – harmony vocals, "Sitting Alone in the Moonlight"

References 

Peter Rowan albums
David Grisman live albums
1998 live albums